Abel Resino Gómez (born 2 February 1960), sometimes known just as Abel, is a Spanish retired footballer who played as a goalkeeper, and a manager.

Nicknamed El Gato (The Cat) due to his reflexes, he played most of his professional career at Atlético Madrid. For roughly one year, starting in early 2009, he also coached the club, helping it qualify once for the Champions League.

Over ten seasons, nine of those with Atlético, Abel appeared in 264 matches in La Liga.

Playing career
Born in Velada, Province of Toledo, Abel arrived at Atlético Madrid in 1982 from lowly CD Ciempozuelos after also having represented local CD Toledo, but would have to wait five years (four of those spent with the reserve side, only managing to be first-choice in his third season) to become a starter. He went on to amass over 300 overall appearances for the club, winning back-to-back Copa del Rey trophies.

Abel held the record for the longest clean sheet in La Liga at 1,275 minutes, finally being beaten by Luis Enrique of Sporting de Gijón on 19 March 1991. This record was also the European record in a single season until 2009, when Edwin van Der Sar from Manchester United broke it against Fulham.

Leaving the Colchoneros precisely before the team's double conquest in 1995–96, Abel closed out his career at the age of 36 after one season with Madrid neighbours Rayo Vallecano, helping them retain their top division status. He played in two 1991 friendlies with Spain, the first being on 27 March in a 4–2 defeat to Hungary and the second with Romania the following month.

Coaching career
After retiring, Resino returned to Atlético in different periods and capacities (goalkeeper coach, sporting director). In 2005 he started his head coaching career, with second division's Ciudad de Murcia, leading the side to a near-top level promotion after finishing fourth.

Resino's next stop was Levante UD, which had in fact promoted the previous year. After taking charge midway through the campaign, replacing Juan Ramón López Caro, he helped the team avoid relegation and had his contract renewed; seven games and six losses into the following season, however, he was sacked.

After one and a half solid seasons in the second level with CD Castellón, Resino returned to Atlético, replacing released Javier Aguirre in February 2009 and helping the team to exactly the same place as the previous year, with the subsequent qualification to the UEFA Champions League, after which he agreed to an extension. On 23 October he was fired following a poor string of results – only one win in the league from seven matches, the culmination being the 0–4 group stage defeat at Chelsea for the Champions League.

In early December 2010, Abel was appointed head coach of Real Valladolid in the second division, replacing the dismissed Antonio Gómez. His first game in charge produced nine goals, a 4–5 home loss against CD Numancia.

Resino was appointed at Granada CF on 22 January 2012, replacing Fabri González following a 0–3 away loss at RCD Espanyol, fired even though the club was still out of the relegation zone. On 18 February of the following year he returned to active and the top flight, taking the place of Paco Herrera at relegation-threatened side RC Celta de Vigo.

Resino returned to Granada on 19 January 2015, replacing the dismissed Joaquín Caparrós at the helm of the bottom-placed team. He was relieved of his duties on 1 May, after only being able to climb one position in the table.

Managerial statistics

Honours

Player
Atlético Madrid
Copa del Rey: 1990–91, 1991–92
Supercopa de España: 1985

Individual
Ricardo Zamora Trophy: 1990–91

References

External links

1960 births
Living people
Sportspeople from the Province of Toledo
Spanish footballers
Footballers from Castilla–La Mancha
Association football goalkeepers
La Liga players
Segunda División players
Tercera División players
CD Toledo players
Atlético Madrid B players
Atlético Madrid footballers
Rayo Vallecano players
Spain international footballers
Spanish football managers
La Liga managers
Segunda División managers
Ciudad de Murcia managers
Levante UD managers
CD Castellón managers
Atlético Madrid managers
Real Valladolid managers
Granada CF managers
RC Celta de Vigo managers